L'Islette Island is an island in Seychelles, located 120 meters from the eastern coast of the island of Mahe, in the bay of Port Glaud. It is also near Thérèse Island which lies to its southwest and Petite Island which lies to its east. L'Islette Island is a granite island densely covered with tropical vegetation (trees and shrubs).

Administration
The island belongs to Port Glaud District.

Tourism
Today, the island's main industry is tourism. It once had a restaurant managed by Constance Ephelia resort on nearby Mahe, but today it is closed. The island was recently purchased by local entrepreneur Mary Geers who plans to build a resort on the island, but meanwhile she is filming the reality The island of love from Russian channel TNT on the island.

Image gallery

References

External links 

 National Bureau of Statistics
 info
 Mahe Map 2015
 Info on the island
 L'Islette Island Gallery

Islands of Port Glaud